Świnka may refer to:
 Świnka coat of arms
 Jakub Świnka